DaRon McGee is an American politician who served in the Missouri House of Representatives from the 36th district from 2016 to 2019.

He resigned on April 29, 2019, after being accused of sexual harassment.

References

Living people
Democratic Party members of the Missouri House of Representatives
Year of birth missing (living people)